LQ Andromedae (shortened as LQ And, also known as HR 9070 in the Bright Star Catalogue) is a variable star in the constellation Andromeda. Its maximum apparent visual magnitude is 6.5, placing it at the limit of the visibility to the naked eye. The brightness, however, drops down to 6.66 with a periodic cycle of roughly 7.44 hours.

The stellar classification of this star is B4Ven, so it is a main sequence star that shows emission lines and broadened absorption lines induced by the fast projected rotational velocity of 300 km/s (the angle between the rotation axis and our line of sight has been estimated with a value of 72°). This leads to the classification of the star as a Be star. Further proof is the compatibility between the rotational and luminosity variability periods.

LQ Andromedae is also a spectroscopic binary with an orbital period of 7.413 days. Not much is known about the secondary component, but it is likely a low-mass companion (M<0.5 ). A circumstellar disk is also present in the system.

References

Be stars
Andromeda (constellation)
BD+45 4381
224559
118214
9070
B-type main-sequence stars
J23584644+4624474
Spectroscopic binaries
Andromedae, LQ